The Air and Coastal Defense Command or ACDC  ( or shortly called in Thai as  is the Anti-aircraft warfare and Coastal defence force of the Royal Thai Navy. This Command is composed of the two Air Defence Regiment and one Coastal Defence Regiment.Even though they are artillerymen, but they are trained in skills related to self-defense on the battlefield if the fire base is attacked or attacked while moving. However, they are trained protecting equipment, facilities and operations from threats or hazards in order to preserve operational effectiveness.

History
In 1975 the Ministry of Defense approved the principle of air defense with the Royal Thai Navy establishing Air defense fighting unit doing Air defense duties in the area of responsibility of the Navy, such as naval bases and important military locations. On 23 November 1981, the Navy upgraded the air defense unit to the Department of Air and Coastal Defence go directly to Sattahip Naval Base using the area that has been returned from the Royal Thai Air Force. Department of Air and Coastal Defence has been greatly expanded in 1992, following the government's decision in 1988 to charge the Royal Thai Navy with the responsibility of defending the entire eastern seaboard and Southern Seaboard Development Project. As a result of the 1988 government resolution, the responsibility of the navy has been expanded. Beyond the strength of the department, therefore, on 13 August 1990 the Navy upgraded the Department of Air and Coastal Defence to The Air and Coastal Defense Command.

Coastal Defence Command was formed in 1992 under the control of the Royal Fleet Headquarters, with one coastal defence regiment and one air defence regiment. Personnel were initially drawn from the Royal Thai Marine Corps, but are now being recruited directly. The First Coastal Defence Regiment is based near the Marine Corps facility at Sattahip. The First Air Defence Regiment was near the Naval Air Wing at Utapao. Coastal Defence Command was greatly expanded in 1992, following the government's decision in 1988 to charge the RTN with the responsibility of defending the entire eastern seaboard and Southern Seaboard Development Project. The Second Air Defence Regiment, based at Songkhla, was then formed the following year. Some analysts believe that this element will eventually grow to a strength of up to 15,000 personnel.

Structure of Air and Coastal Defense Command

The headquarters of Air and Coastal Defense Command has 12 commanding units as follows;
Personnel Division
Intelligence Division
Operations Division
Logistics Division
Division of Communication and Information Technology 
Budget Division
Science and Safety Aviation Division
Division of Engineering Plans
Administration Department
Finance Department
Judge Advocate Department
Chaplain Department

Combat Structure
 1st Air Defence Regiment: their mission is to provide anti-aircraft warfare for the northern Gulf of Thailand with three anti-aircraft battalions.
 11th Air Combat Battalion, Ban Chang, Rayong
 12th Air Combat Battalion, Si Racha, Chon Buri
 13th Air Combat Battalion, Phra Samut Chedi, Samut Prakan
 2nd Air Defence Regiment: to provide anti-aircraft warfare for the southern Gulf of Thailand and Andaman Sea with three anti-aircraft battalions.
 21st Air Combat Battalion, Khanom, Nakhon Si Thammarat
 22nd Air Combat Battalion, Thai Mueang, Phang Nga
 23th Air Combat Battalion, Mueang Songkhla, Songkhla
 1st Coastal Defence Regiment: has three artillery battalions.
 11th Coastal Defense Battalion, Thai Mueang, Phang Nga
 12th Coastal Defense Battalion, Mueang Songkhla, Songkhla
 13th Coastal Defense Battalion, Sattahip, Chon Buri
 Air and Coastal Defence Operations Centers
  1st Air and Coastal Defense Operations Center Region
 1st Control and Reporting Center
 2nd Control and Reporting Center
  2nd Air and Coastal Defense Operations Center Region
 1st Control and Reporting Center
 2nd Control and Reporting Center
 Air and Coastal Defence Supporting Regiment:
 Transportation Battalion
 Medical Battalion
 Communications and Electronics Battalion
 Repair and Maintenance Battalion
 1st Headquarters Annex 
 2nd Headquarters Annex 
 3rd Headquarters Annex 
 Air and Coastal Defense Training Center (ACDTC)
 Air and Coastal Defense School
 Air and Coastal Defense Private Training Division
 Air and Coastal Defense Training Battalion
  Support Section

Equipment

Weapons

Radar

Logistic vehicle

Historic Equipments

Engagements
 Southern Insurgency
 Cambodian–Thai border dispute

Rank structure

See also
 Admiral Prince Abhakara Kiartiwongse Prince of Chumphon
 Royal Thai Armed Forces Headquarters
 Military of Thailand
 Royal Thai Army
 Royal Thai Air Force
 Royal Thai Marine Corps
 Royal Thai Naval Academy

References

Citations

External links
 RTN Official site 
 Global Security – Thailand navy

Royal Thai Navy
Military units and formations of Thailand
Naval units and formations
Air defence units and formations